Franklin Twist (born 2 November 1940) is an English footballer, who played as a winger in the Football League for Bury and Tranmere Rovers.

Early life
Twist was a pupil of Roscoe Secondary Modern School as a child.

Career

Youth
Twist began his career as a junior with Liverpool. After playing "several outstanding games" for his school which brought him prominence in the 1955 season, he made his debut for the Liverpool senior youth team in the sixth round of the English trophy. Liverpool played Swansea F.C. at Anfield, in what was considered among the most difficult debuts for a youth player, as Swansea had a record five international players. He helped his side go on to win the game 7-0 and kept his place in the team, ultimately winning a medal when Liverpool beat Brighton in the final 7-2. He was praised for his quick speed and ball control.

Senior
Following his release from Liverpool, he trained as an electrician while playing for Prescot Cables. He joined Bury in 1961, making his debut against Walsall. 

In 1965, Twist joined Tranmere Rovers, where he made 7 league appearances, scoring 1 goal, along with an appearance in the League Cup.

After a spell with New Brighton, he joined Altrincham in 1967. He made his debut against Chester City, going on to make 60 appearances for the club, scoring 5 goals. During his time at Altrincham, the club won the Northwest Floodlit League and the Cheshire County League, the Cheshire Senior Cup. Twist left the club at the end of the season, rounding off his career with spells at New Brighton and Radcliffe Borough.

His first international youth game was against Yugoslavia youth in 1958, where he played as an outside right.

References

Tranmere Rovers F.C. players
Halifax Town A.F.C. players
Altrincham F.C. players
New Brighton A.F.C. players
Association football wingers
English Football League players
Bury F.C. players
Liverpool F.C. players
Prescot Cables F.C. players
1940 births
Living people
Footballers from Liverpool
English footballers